Beaufort Burdekin (27 December 1891 – 15 May 1963) was a British rower who competed in the 1912 Summer Olympics.

Burdekin was born in Dorset but came from an Australian family after whom the Burdekin River was named. He was educated at Cheltenham College and at New College, Oxford. He was a crew member of the New College eight which won the silver medal for Great Britain rowing at the 1912 Summer Olympics. In 1914 he was a member of the Oxford Boat in the Boat Race.

Burdekin became a member of Inner Temple. He served in the Royal Field Artillery during World War I and was wounded in action in France. In 1920 he went with his family to Sydney, Australia where he was a barrister.

Burdekin married the feminist novelist Katharine Penelope Cade in 1915. They had two daughters, Katharine Jayne (b. 1917) and Helen Eugenie (b. 1920).  The marriage ended in 1922.

See also
List of Oxford University Boat Race crews

References

External links
profile

1891 births
1963 deaths
People educated at Cheltenham College
Alumni of New College, Oxford
English male rowers
British male rowers
Olympic rowers of Great Britain
Rowers at the 1912 Summer Olympics
Olympic silver medallists for Great Britain
Royal Field Artillery officers
Australian barristers
Olympic medalists in rowing
Sportspeople from Gloucestershire
Medalists at the 1912 Summer Olympics
British Army personnel of World War I